"I Really Like You" is a song recorded by Canadian singer Carly Rae Jepsen for her third studio album, Emotion (2015). It was written by Jepsen, Jacob Kasher Hindlin, Peter Svensson, and Steve DaMar; and produced by Svensson. The song was released as the album's lead single on 2 March 2015.

"I Really Like You" peaked at number 14 on the Canadian Hot 100. Outside of Canada, "I Really Like You" topped the charts in Hong Kong and Scotland, peaked within the top ten of the charts in Czech Republic, Denmark, Finland, Japan, the Republic of Ireland, South Africa, and the United Kingdom, and peaked within the top 20 of the charts in Austria, Germany, Slovakia and Switzerland. The song's accompanying music video starred Tom Hanks and featured Justin Bieber, and was released 5 March 2015.

Writing and production
"I Really Like You" was written by Jepsen, Jacob Kasher Hindlin and Peter Svensson, and produced by the latter. According to Jepsen, the song's lyrics are about "that time in a relationship when it's too soon to say 'I love you,' but you're well past, 'I like you' and you're at the 'I really, really like you' stage."

Composition
Soraya Nadia McDonald of The Washington Post characterized "I Really Like You" as a synth-pop song, musically reminiscent of Jepsen's previous album Kiss (2012), 1980s music and Solange Knowles' 2012 EP True. The Verges Emily Yoshida noted elements of 1980s and new wave. Ryan Reed of Rolling Stone described the track as a "dance-pop number". Musically, the song is written in the key of F major, with a tempo of 122 beats per minute. Jepsen's vocals span from G3 to D5.

Critical reception
Jason Lipshutz of Billboard called the song "really (really) fun" and "a breathless 80's banger that comes back to [2012 single] 'Call Me Maybe's fixation on ultra-crisp percussion and blurted-out flirtation". Idolators Bianca Gracie described "I Really Like You" as "mind-blowing, fantastic, catchy-as-hell pop".

In October 2022, Rachel Seo of Variety ranked "I Really Like You" as Jepsen's 13th best song, writing: "'I want you. Do you want me? Do you want me too?' reads like a succession of desperate Snapchat messages, but Jepsen's ascending soprano seamlessly weaves through Jeff Halavacs and Peter Svensson's electro-pop production, sounding more enthusiastic than anything else."

Commercial performance
In Canada, "I Really Like You" debuted at number 14 on the Canadian Hot 100 issued for March 21, 2015, marking Jepsen's seventh top 40 hit in Canada.

In the United States, "I Really Like You" debuted at number 48 on the Billboard Hot 100 on March 21, 2015, selling 38,000 copies in its first week. It peaked at number 39 on 2 May 2015, marking Jepsen's third top 40 hit in the United States.

In the United Kingdom, the song debuted and peaked at number three on the UK Singles Chart on May 3, 2015 – for week ending date May 9, 2015 – a position it maintained for two consecutive weeks. In September 2020, the song re-entered the UK iTunes chart and has remained inside the top 100 for two months since.

Music video
The music video was directed by Peter Glanz. Jepsen filmed part of the song's music video on 16 February 2015, in front of the Mondrian Hotel in Manhattan alongside Tom Hanks, Justin Bieber and a troupe of dancers. Also making cameo appearances in the video are Rudy Mancuso and King Bach, well-known users of the short-form video sharing application Vine. The video was released on 6 March 2015. CBC Music's Nicolle Weeks described it as "a more affable version" of the music video for The Verve's "Bitter Sweet Symphony" (1997). The music video has been rated as one of 10 Best Music Videos of 2015 (So Far) by the readers of Billboard.

Live performances and covers

Jepsen performed "I Really Like You" live on Good Morning America on 2 March 2015, followed by a performance on Jimmy Kimmel Live! on 5 March 2015 and Sunrise on 11 March 2015. She also performed the song on Saturday Night Live, Castle, Jimmy Kimmel Live!, Dancing with the Stars, Much Music Video Awards, and The Ellen DeGeneres Show.

Track listings
Digital download
 "I Really Like You" – 3:24

Digital download – remixes EP
 "I Really Like You" (Blasterjaxx Remix) – 3:35
 "I Really Like You" (The Scene Kings Remix) – 3:17
 "I Really Like You" (The Scene Kings Extended Remix) – 4:35
 "I Really Like You" (Wayne G. Club Mix) – 7:39
 "I Really Like You" (Liam Keegan Remix Radio Edit) – 3:09
 "I Really Like You" (Liam Keegan Extended Remix) – 4:39

Charts

Weekly charts

Year-end charts

Certifications

Release history

References

2015 singles
604 Records singles
Schoolboy Records singles
Interscope Records singles
Carly Rae Jepsen songs
Number-one singles in Scotland
Songs written by Carly Rae Jepsen
Songs written by Jacob Kasher
Songs written by Peter Svensson
2015 songs